The 2019 Match Premier Cup was the second edition of Match Premier Cup, a friendly association football tournament played in Austria.

Teams

Standings

Matches

References

External links

Match Premier Cup
Match Premier Cup
Match Premier Cup
Football competitions in Austria